Wumen Huikai (Wade-Giles: Wu-men Hui-k'ai) (1183–1260) was a Chinese Chán (Japanese: Zen) master during China‘s Song period. He is most famous for having compiled and commentated the 48-koan collection The Gateless Barrier (Mandarin: 無門關 Wúménguān; Japanese: 無門関 Mumonkan).

Early life and education
Wumen was born in Hangzhou. His first master was Gong Heshang. 
Wumen received his spiritual education, also called Dharma transmission in Buddhist teaching, in the Linji line (Japanese: Rinzai) of Zen from Zen master Yuelin Shiguan (月林師觀; Japanese: Gatsurin Shikan) (1143–1217). Yuelin gave Wumen the koan, a spiritual question, of "Zhaozhou’s dog", with which Wu-men struggled for six years before he attained realization. After Yuelin confirmed Wumen‘s understanding of it, Wumen wrote his enlightenment poem:

A thunderclap under the clear blue sky
All beings on earth open their eyes;
Everything under heaven bows together;
Mount Sumeru leaps up and dances.

Career
In many respects, Wumen was the classical eccentric Zen master. He wandered from temple to temple for many years, wore old and dirty robes, grew his hair and beard long and worked in the temple fields. He was nicknamed "Huikai the Lay Monk".
Wumen compiled and commentated the 48-koan collection The Gateless Barrier when he was the head monk of Longxiang (Wade-Giles: Lung-hsiang; Japanese: Ryusho) monastery.

At age 64, he founded Gokoku-ninno temple near West Lake where he hoped to retire quietly, but visitors constantly came looking for instruction.

Work
His teachings, as revealed in his comments in Gate of Emptiness, closely followed those of Dahui Zonggao (大慧宗杲; Wade-Giles: Ta-hui Tsung-kao; Japanese: Daei Sōkō) (1089–1163). The importance of "Great Doubt" was one of his central teaching devices. Wumen said, "...[understanding Zen is] just a matter of rousing the mass of doubt throughout your body, day and night, and never letting up." In his comment on Case 1, Zhaozhou's dog, he called mu (無) "a red-hot iron ball which you have gulped down and which you try to vomit up, but cannot".

Wumen believed in blocking all avenues of escape for the student, hence the "gateless barrier". Whatever activity a student proposed, Wumen rejected: "If you follow regulations, keeping the rules, you tie yourself without rope, but if you act any which way without inhibition you're a heretical demon. ... Clear alertness is wearing chains and stocks. Thinking good and bad is hell and heaven. ... Neither progressing nor retreating, you're a dead man with breath. So tell me, ultimately how do you practice?"

References

Further reading
 Cleary, Thomas (1993) No Barrier: unlocking the zen koan; Aquarian/Thorsons 
 Sekida, Katsuki (1995) Two Zen Classics: Mumonkan and Hekiganroku; Weatherhill

External links
 

1183 births
1260 deaths
Chan Buddhist monks
Chinese spiritual writers
Chinese Zen Buddhists
Rinzai Buddhists
Song dynasty Buddhist monks
Song dynasty writers
Writers from Hangzhou